Live at Sandy's is a live album by saxophonist Buddy Tate which was recorded at Sandy's Jazz Revival in 1978 and released on the Muse label in 1980.

Reception

The AllMusic review by Scott Yanow stated "Consistently swinging music and one of the better Buddy Tate recordings currently available".

Track listing
 "Jumpin' at the Woodside" (Count Basie, Eddie Durham) – 7:35
 "Blue Creek" (Buddy Tate) – 7:22
 "Candy" (Alex Kramer, Mack David, Joan Whitney) – 5:38
 "Tangerine" (Victor Schertzinger, Johnny Mercer) – 10:05
 "She's Got It" (Arnett Cobb, Buddy Tate) – 10:15

Personnel
Buddy Tate - tenor saxophone, clarinet
Eddie "Cleanhead" Vinson – alto saxophone
Arnett Cobb – tenor saxophone
Ray Bryant – piano
George Duvivier – bass
Alan Dawson – drums

References

Muse Records live albums
Buddy Tate live albums
1980 live albums
Albums produced by Bob Porter (record producer)